Jan Jochen Dragtsma (born 23 October 1955) is a Dutch football manager, who was the coach of FC Volendam for around a year (2004–2005). He also managed FC Inter Turku in Finland, with whom he won the national title in 2008, Finnish League Cup in 2008 and the Finnish Cup in 2009. He resigned from FC Inter in May 2016.

In August 2010 he was linked in the Finnish press to the Finland national football team as a possible replacement for Stuart Baxter.
Dragtsma is fluent in Dutch, English, Finnish and Swedish.

References

  Profile

1955 births
Living people
Dutch football managers
Eredivisie managers
FC Volendam managers
FC Inter Turku managers
Sportspeople from Alkmaar
Dutch expatriate sportspeople in Finland
AFC '34 managers